Helper-component proteinase (HC-Pro) is an enzyme. This enzyme catalyses the following chemical reaction

 Hydrolyses a Gly-Gly bond at its own C-terminus, commonly in the sequence -Tyr-Xaa-Val-Gly-Gly, in the processing of the potyviral polyprotein

This enzyme is present in plant RNA viruses of the Potyviridae family. HC-Pro is encoded by all potyviruses, but is absent in some members of the Ipomovirus genus. HC-Pro is involved in virus transmission, virus polyprotein processing, and suppression of RNA silencing, an antiviral mechanism of plants.

References

External links 
 

EC 3.4.22